Pontifical committee may refer to the following bodies in the Roman Curia:
Pontifical Committee for International Eucharistic Congresses, established in 1879
Pontifical Committee for Historical Sciences, established in 1954